Kahriz (also Romanized as Kahrīz) is a village in Anzal-e Jonubi Rural District, Anzal District, Urmia County, West Azerbaijan Province, Iran. At the 2006 census, its population was 2,553, in 560 families. This village populated by Azerbaijanians with Sunni Hanafi religion.

References 

Populated places in Urmia County